The 2011 Nigerian Senate election in Kebbi State was held on April 9, 2011, to elect members of the Nigerian Senate to represent Kebbi State. Isah Mohammed Galaudu representing Kebbi North, Abubakar Atiku Bagudu representing Kebbi Central and Mohammed Magoro representing Kebbi South all won on the platform of Peoples Democratic Party.

Overview

Summary

Results

Kebbi North 
Peoples Democratic Party candidate Isah Mohammed Galaudu won the election, defeating other party candidates.

Kebbi Central 
Peoples Democratic Party candidate Abubakar Atiku Bagudu won the election, defeating other party candidates.

Kebbi South 
Peoples Democratic Party candidate Mohammed Magoro won the election, defeating party candidates.

References 

Kebbi State Senate elections
Kebbi State senatorial elections
Kebbi State senatorial elections